Kavita Nandini Ramdas (born 1963) is a globally recognized advocate for gender equity and justice.

Previously, she was the director of the Open Society Foundations’ Women's Rights Program and the senior advisor to the Ford Foundation's president, Darren Walker. She assumed the position in 2015 after serving for 3 years as Ford's India country representative, representing the office in India, Nepal, and Sri Lanka. Prior to that, she was executive director of the Program on Social Entrepreneurship at the Freeman Spogli Institute for International Studies at Stanford University. Kavita is best known for her contribution to feminist philanthropy as former president and CEO of the Global Fund for Women.

Background and affiliations 
Kavita Ramdas is the daughter of Lalita Ramdas and Admiral Laxminarayan Ramdas, former Head of the Indian Navy.

Kavita Ramdas was born in Delhi, India and grew up in Mumbai, Delhi, London, Rangoon, and Bonn. She attended high school at the Nikolaus Cusanus Gymnasium in Bad Godesberg, Bonn, Germany; the Cathedral and John Connon School, Mumbai, and graduated from Springdales School, New Delhi, in 1980. She studied Political Science at Hindu College, University of Delhi for two years until 1982. In 1983, she was awarded a scholarship to Mount Holyoke College, South Hadley, Massachusetts, where she received her B.A. in international relations in 1985 and her M.P.A. in international development and public policy studies from the Woodrow Wilson School of Public and International Affairs at Princeton University in 1988.

In 1990 Ramdas married Zulfiqar Ahmad, a peace advocate, whom she had met in college. Zulfiqar is the nephew of the Pakistani academic and anti-war activist, Eqbal Ahmed, one of the Harrisburg Seven. Given her father's stature as a senior naval officer, there was speculation that their relationship could compromise India's national security.

Ramdas is a former member of the Global Development Program Advisory Panel to the Bill & Melinda Gates Foundation, and serves on the Board of Trustees at Princeton University, on the Council of Advisors on Gender Equity to the Woodrow Wilson School at Princeton University, and on the Advisory Council to the Asian University for Women and the African Women Millennium Initiative on Poverty and Human Rights. She is a member of the Henry Crown Fellow's Program of the Aspen Institute and previously served as a board member for the Women's Funding Network.

Work at the Global Fund for Women 
Kavita Ramdas was the President and CEO of the Global Fund for Women from 1996 until 2010. During Ramdas’ tenure, the Global Fund for Women assets grew from $6 million to $21 million. Grantmaking increased to $8 million per year, and the number of countries in which the Global Fund for Women made grants nearly tripled to over 160 countries. Ramdas also oversaw the Global Fund for Women's first endowment campaign and the creation of the Now or Never Fund to ensure women's participation on critical international issues.

Ramdas also served in advisory and/or management roles at MADRE, the John D. and Catherine T. MacArthur Foundation, the Ford Foundation, and the Stanford University Program on Social Entrepreneurship.

In 2018 Ramdas was named director of Women's Rights Programs for the Open Society Foundations.

Honors and awards 
 California Institute of Integral Studies, Haridas and Bina Chaudhuri Award for Distinguished Service, 2009
 Duveneck Humanitarian Award, 2008
 Social Capitalist Award, Fast Company (magazine), 2007
 Women of Great Esteem Award, 2007
 Girl's Hero Award, Girls' Middle School, 2007
 Woman of Substance Award, African Women's Development Fund, 2005
 Juliette Gordon Low Award, Girl Scouts of the USA, 2005
 Woman of the Year for the Public Sector, Financial Women's Association, 2004
 Leadership for Equity & Diversity (LEAD) Award, Women & Philanthropy, 2004
 Bay Area Local Hero, KQED-FM Radio, 2004
 21 Leaders for the 21st Century Award, Women's eNews, 2003

See also 
 List of Indian Americans

References

External links 
 The high court nominee stays true to her school, 2009
 Women Can Lead the Way to Recovery, 2009
 Leveraging the Power of Race and Gender, February 2008
 Kavita Ramdas Defines Entrepreneurship: Video - 21 February 2008
 Global Fund for Women biography
 Princeton biography
 Mount Holyoke Vista
 PBS
 Then and Now, Kavita Ramdas, 2002
 A Women's Work, 2002
 Why educating girls is not enough: Video, March 2012
 Women's Funding Network official site

American activists
Indian emigrants to the United States
Mount Holyoke College alumni
1960s births
American Hindus
Living people
Princeton School of Public and International Affairs alumni
American people of Indian descent
American businesspeople
Businesswomen from Delhi
Women scientists from Delhi
Henry Crown Fellows
21st-century American women